The 1972 United States presidential election in Arizona took place on November 7, 1972, as part of the 1972 United States presidential election. State voters chose six representatives, or electors, to the Electoral College, who voted for president and vice president.

Arizona was won by incumbent President Richard Nixon (R–California), with 61.64% of the popular vote, against George McGovern (D–South Dakota), with 30.38% of the popular vote. Socialist Workers Party electors and John G. Schmitz, the only other candidates on the ballot, combined for just over 52,000 votes and over seven percent of Arizona's popular vote. Even in a huge landslide, this result left Arizona exactly 8% more Republican than the nation at-large.

In a state that would reflect McGovern's national results, the Democratic nominee won only one county in Arizona: heavily unionized Greenlee County, where no Republican had won before this nor would win until George W. Bush in 2000.

The massive surge in ballots for the Socialist candidate (there had been only 85 in 1968, now there were nearly 31,000) was due to a ballot error in Pima County. Linda Jenness, the Socialist Workers candidate, was only 31, and thus was deemed ineligible to be put on the ballot. Instead, the names of her six electors were listed. However, the layout of the ballot was what caused the confusion. Atop the ballot was "President of the United States (Vote for one)" with the given options of Nixon, McGovern, and Schmitz. Below that was "Presidential Electors (Vote for six)," and the names of the six Socialist Workers' electors. The text labelling the as "Socialist Workers' Party" was only half as small as the instructions to vote for six, and thus 28,000 voters followed both instructions, likely perceiving the Socialist electors as being part of a separate race. The Secretary of State, Wesley Bolin, and Attorney General, Gary Nelson, at first agreed the ballots ought to be thrown out. Pima County election chief David O'Hern and county attorney Rose Silver believed the ballots should be counted since the Socialist Workers candidate had been disqualified. In the end, that was the line of thinking taken, and the votes were counted for both the candidates they were cast for. This resulted not only in an increase in the state's total by some 28,000, but that in some Democratic southside precincts, the Socialist ticket outperformed Nixon and was the only place the landslide victor came third anywhere in the country.

Results

Results by county

Notes

References

Arizona
1972
1972 Arizona elections